Stephensons of Essex is a privately owned bus company based in Rochford, Essex. It operates local bus services throughout Essex and West Suffolk, from headquarters at Rochford, near Southend-on-Sea, and depots at Maldon, Boreham, Braintree and Haverhill.

It also runs a bus and coach dealership and sales service.

History

Stephensons was founded in Rochford in 1975, and has since expanded by gaining contracts for tendered bus routes and school routes.

In 2001 after Arriva Southend decided to withdraw their route 721 service, Stephensons commenced operating routes X1 and X10 from Rochford to London under the London Link Express brand. X1 was the original number of the service when it was first launched in 1980. Stephensons withdrew the service on 11 July 2008. Swallow Coach Company revived the service on 14 August 2008 but it again ceased on 29 May 2009.

In 2005 Stephensons won a contract to operate the Dengie Connections services from Arriva Southend, which it operated for five years from April 2007. In 2012 this was extended for a further four years.

In 2008 it won the contract to run Withamlink services 38 and 39.

In November 2016, Stephensons of Essex owner Bill Hiron purchased Galloway European. The two businesses operate independently. In October 2018 it was announced Stephensons had purchased local bus operator NIBS Buses (Nelsons Independent Bus Services), based in Wickford, Essex and would run as a separate entity.

In September 2022, Stephensons has registered a partial replacement for one of the 18 services that Stagecoach East is to withdraw from late October, taking over the route 12 between Cambridge and Newmarket.

Services
Stephensons operate 93 services in Essex and 17 in Suffolk.

Fleet
As at December 2020, the fleet consisted of 107 buses and coaches.

Current Fleet:

 Plaxton Paragon
 Mercedes Sprinter
 Optare Solo
 Dennis Dart SLF/Plaxton Pointer 2
 Alexander Dennis Enviro 200
 Scania N230UD/Optare Olympus
 Scania N230UD/East Lancs Olympus
 Scania N230UD/Scania OmniCity
 Scania N230UD/Alexander Dennis Enviro 400
 Scania N94UD/East Lancs OmniDekka

Depots
Stephensons operate bus services from five depots in Rochford, Boreham, Haverhill, Maldon and Braintree. Stephensons also has an outstation in Great Bromley.

Rochford 
Rochford depot is situated on South Street and was the first depot opened by Stephensons in 1975. It remains as an operational depot and is the Headquarters of the company.

Rochford depot operates routes 1, 6A, 7, 12, 14, 17, 24, 60/A and 61. It also operates school services 515, 806-813 (for King Edmund School), 815, 816 and 817.

Routes 1 and 12 are jointly operated with NIBS Buses.

Boreham 
Boreham depot is situated on the Waltham Road Industrial Estate and is Stephensons newest facility, which opened in 2014. It also houses a new, "state of the art" maintenance and engineering capability for the company.

Boreham depot operates services in mid Essex. These include routes 16, 30, Three Rivers route 38/A, 39, and Brentwood Town services 71/C and 72. It also operates school routes 602, 605/A (for Great Baddow High School) and 621.

Haverhill 
Haverhill depot is situated on Duddery Hill and operates all of their services in Suffolk and West Essex. 

Haverhill depot operates routes "Breeze 1 & 2", 5, 6, 14, 15, 16, 34, 59, 60, 301, 313/A, 384 and 385. It also operates school services 25, 310, 311/A, 351, 438, 441, 444, 446, 453, 966 and 985.

Maldon 
Maldon depot is situated on Bates Road and operates services in mid-Essex.

Maldon depot operates routes 12, Blackwater Link 90 and Maldon Town Service 288. It also operates school routes 101, 503, 504, 505, 506, 510, 513, 637, 673 and D7.

Braintree 
Braintree depot is situated on Springwood Road and was taken over from First Essex in 2013.

Braintree depot operates routes 9/A, 21, 30 and Three Rivers 38/A which is operated in conjunction with Boreham. It also operates school services 414, 417, 419, 451 and 676.

Great Bromley (Outstation) 
Great Bromley Outstation primarily operates North Essex services. Maintenance takes place at Boreham.

Great Bromley operates routes 9, 105, 107. It also operates school services 101, 115, 702 and 716.

References

External links

Company website
Flickr gallery

Bus operators in Essex
Coach operators in England
Companies based in Essex
Transport in the City of Chelmsford
Transport in Essex
Transport in Southend-on-Sea
Transport in Thurrock
1975 establishments in England